Alne railway station was a station which served the village of Alne in the English county of North Yorkshire. It was served by trains on the main line between York and Thirsk. From 1891 to 1957 it was the junction of the Easingwold Railway which connected the main line to the town of Easingwold.

History

Opened by the Great North of England Railway. It became part of the London and North Eastern Railway during the Grouping of 1923, passing on to the Eastern Region of British Railways during the nationalisation of 1948. It was then closed by the British Transport Commission.

In 1930, a third track was added at Alne and in 1959 fourth track was laid down. The station buildings were demolished in 1964 and since then, the line between York and Northallerton has been four tracks - two up lines and two down lines.

Bradshaws Railway Timetable of 1922 indicates that there was eight trains per day in each direction on the Easingwold line.

Accidents and incidents
In 1877 the boiler of a locomotive exploded whilst it was hauling a freight train.

The site today

Trains still pass at speed on the now electrified East Coast Main Line. Electrification was completed between York and Newcastle in 1990.

References

Further reading
 
 
 
 
 Station on navigable O.S. map

Former North Eastern Railway (UK) stations
Disused railway stations in North Yorkshire
Railway stations in Great Britain opened in 1841
Railway stations in Great Britain closed in 1958